Euphorbia mahabobokensis is a species of plant in the family Euphorbiaceae. It is endemic to Madagascar.  Its natural habitats are subtropical or tropical dry forests and subtropical or tropical dry shrubland. It is threatened by habitat loss.

References

Endemic flora of Madagascar
mahabobokensis
Vulnerable plants
Taxonomy articles created by Polbot